David or Dave Hernandez may refer to:

David Hernandez (actor) (born 1968)  American film and Television Actor

 David Hernandez (singer) (born 1983), American singer
 David Hernandez (baseball) (born 1985), American baseball player
 David Hernandez (poet) (born 1971), American poet
 Dave Hernandez (born 1970), musician best known for playing with the American band The Shins
 David Hernández de la Fuente (born 1974), writer from Spain
 David Hernández Pérez (born 1960), Mexican politician